The 2010–11 Vijay Hazare Trophy was the ninth season of the Vijay Hazare Trophy, a List A cricket tournament in India. It was contested between 27 domestic cricket teams of India, starting in February and finishing in March 2011. In the final, Jharkhand beat Gujarat by 159 runs to win their maiden title.

References

External links
 Series home at ESPN Cricinfo

Vijay Hazare Trophy
Vijay Hazare Trophy